Bryan Glacier is a glacier that flows north along the eastern side of the Werner Mountains and merges with Douglas Glacier on entering New Bedford Inlet in Palmer Land. It was mapped by the United States Geological Survey from ground surveys and from U.S. Navy air photos, 1961–67, and named by the Advisory Committee on Antarctic Names for Terry E. Bryan, glaciologist at Byrd Station, summer 1966–67.

References

 

Glaciers of Palmer Land